Lasse Bøchman (born 13 June 1983) is a Danish former professional road bicycle racer. He joined Team CSC, as they were then known, in early 2008 after performing beyond expectations during a training camp in Majorca.

For the 2014 season, Bøchman rejoined , his fourth such spell with the team; he previously competed with the squad in 2005, 2007 and between 2010 and 2012.

Major results

2007
6th Overall Flèche du Sud
9th Overall Danmark Rundt
2009
4th Overall Bayern-Rundfahrt
2010
1st Overall Flèche du Sud
4th Overall Circuit des Ardennes
4th Overall Ringerike GP
8th GP Herning
2011
1st Overall Flèche du Sud
1st Stage 4
3rd Overall Rhône-Alpes Isère Tour
4th Himmerland Rundt
9th Rutland–Melton International CiCLE Classic
2012
5th Overall Flèche du Sud
10th Overall Rhône-Alpes Isère Tour
10th Overall Kreiz Breizh Elites
2014
2nd Hadeland GP
4th National Time Trial Championships
7th Overall Rhône-Alpes Isère Tour

References

External links

Team CSC profile

1983 births
Living people
Danish male cyclists
People from Næstved Municipality
Sportspeople from Region Zealand